Laetitia (minor planet designation: 39 Laetitia) is a large main-belt asteroid that was discovered by French astronomer Jean Chacornac on 9 February 1856 and named after Laetitia, a minor Roman goddess of gaiety. The spectrum matches an S-type, indicating a stony (silicate) composition.

Photometric observations of this asteroid gathered between 1968–74 were used to build a light curve that provided shape and rotation information. It has the general shape of an elongated triaxial ellipsoid with ratios between the lengths of the axes equal to 15:9:5. Major surface features are on a scale of 10 km and the surface color does not vary significantly across the surface. In the ecliptic coordinate system, the pole of rotation is estimated to be oriented to the coordinates (λ0, β0) =.

In 1988 a search for satellites or dust orbiting this asteroid was performed using the UH88 telescope at the Mauna Kea Observatories, but the effort came up empty. Photometric observations collected during 2006–08 were used to measure time variations of the asteroid light curve. This data suggests that the asteroid may have a complex shape or it could be a binary asteroid system.

References

External links 
 
 

S-type asteroids (SMASS)
S-type asteroids (Tholen)
Background asteroids
Laetitia
Laetitia
18560208
Objects observed by stellar occultation